Edith Marie McGuire (born June 3, 1944), later known as Edith McGuire Duvall, is an American former sprinter.

Born in Atlanta, Georgia, McGuire ran for Tennessee State University. TSU had a very successful women's sprinting team, The Tigerbelles, in the 1960s, including triple Olympic champions Wilma Rudolph, Wyomia Tyus, and McGuire.

Although McGuire's running career was short, she won six AAU titles, in three different events. Her specialty, however, was the 200 m/220 y, in which she won four of her six national titles. In 1964, she was undefeated in her favorite event, and went to Tokyo as the main contender for the 200 m gold medal at the 1964 Summer Olympics.

McGuire first competed in the 100 m in Japan, and lost out in the final to teammate Tyus. But in the 200 m final, she held off Poland's Irena Kirszenstein to take the gold medal. She added a third medal to her tally as a member of the American 4×100 m relay team, which placed second to Poland.

Edith McGuire ended her athletics career in 1965, and became a teacher. In 1980 she was inducted into the Georgia Sports Hall of Fame. At present, she owns a number of fast food restaurants in Oakland, California together with her husband Charles Duvall.

References

External links

 
 
 
 
  
 

1944 births
Living people
American female sprinters
Tennessee State Lady Tigers track and field athletes
Track and field athletes from Atlanta
Olympic gold medalists for the United States in track and field
Olympic silver medalists for the United States in track and field
Athletes (track and field) at the 1963 Pan American Games
Athletes (track and field) at the 1964 Summer Olympics
Medalists at the 1964 Summer Olympics
Pan American Games gold medalists for the United States
Pan American Games bronze medalists for the United States
Pan American Games medalists in athletics (track and field)
USA Outdoor Track and Field Championships winners
Medalists at the 1963 Pan American Games
Olympic female sprinters